is a railway station in the city of Kashiwazaki, Niigata, Japan, operated by East Japan Railway Company (JR East).

Lines
Nishiyama Station is served by the Echigo Line and is 12.8 kilometers from the terminus of the line at Kashiwazaki Station.

Station layout
The station consists of a two opposed ground-level side platforms connected to the station building by a footbridge.

The station is unattended. Suica farecard cannot be used at this station.

Platforms

History
Nishiyama Station opened on 11 November 1912. With the privatization of Japanese National Railways (JNR) on 1 April 1987, the station came under the control of JR East. A new station building was completed in 1992.

Surrounding area

Nishiyama Post Office

See also
 List of railway stations in Japan

References

External links

 JR East station information 

Railway stations in Niigata Prefecture
Railway stations in Japan opened in 1912
Echigo Line
Stations of East Japan Railway Company
Kashiwazaki, Niigata